"Broken Down Merry-Go-Round" is a country music song written by Fred Stryker and Arthur Herbert, sung by Margaret Whiting and Jimmy Wakely, and released on the Capitol label. In February 1950, it reached No. 2 on the country best seller chart. It spent nine weeks on the charts and was the No. 22 best selling country record of 1950.

See also
 Billboard Top Country & Western Records of 1950

References

Jimmy Wakely songs
Margaret Whiting songs
1950 songs